Kuh Qaen castle or Ghal'eh-Kuh of Qa'en, also known as Husayn Qa'ini Castle, is a historical castle located in Qaen County in South Khorasan Province, The fortress dates back to the Ismailis of the Alamut Period. It was one of their most important strongholds in Quhistan.

References 

Castles in Iran
Castles of the Nizari Ismaili state